3-Ketoacyl-CoA thiolase, peroxisomal also known as acetyl-Coenzyme A acyltransferase 1 is an enzyme that in humans is encoded by the ACAA1 gene.

Acetyl-Coenzyme A acyltransferase 1 is an acetyl-CoA C-acyltransferase enzyme.

Function 

This gene encodes an enzyme operative in the beta oxidation system of the peroxisomes.

Clinical significance 

Deficiency of this enzyme leads to pseudo-Zellweger syndrome.

References

External links

Further reading

Human proteins